The 2015 Pro Kabaddi League was the second season of Pro Kabaddi League. The season started on 18 July 2015. 56 games were played amongst 8 teams. First game was played between U Mumba and Jaipur Pink Panthers. The event was broadcast live by Star Sports in India with commentary in 5 different languages - Kannada, Tamil, Hindi, English & Telugu.

Franchises

Stadium and locations

Personnel

Fixtures and Results

Points Table

League stage

Leg 1:Sardar Vallabhbhai Patel Indoor Stadium, Mumbai

Leg 2:Netaji Indoor Stadium, Kolkata

Leg 3:Sawai Mansingh Indoor Stadium, Jaipur

Leg 4:Patliputra Sports Complex, Patna

Leg 5:Gachibowli Indoor Stadium, Hyderabad

Leg 6:Thyagaraj Sports Complex, Delhi

Leg 7:Kanteerava Indoor Stadium, Bengaluru

Leg 8:Shree Shiv Chhatrapati Sports Complex, Pune

Playoff Stage
Semi-Final 1

Semi-Final 2

3/4 Place

FINAL

Statistics

Most raid points

Most Tackle Points

Most Points

References

Pro Kabaddi League seasons
2015 in Indian sport